Apple cider vinegar, or cider vinegar, is a vinegar made from fermented apple juice, and used in salad dressings, marinades, vinaigrettes, food preservatives, and chutneys. It is made by crushing apples, then squeezing out the juice. Bacteria and yeast are added to the liquid to start the alcoholic fermentation process, which converts the sugars to alcohol. In a second fermentation step, the alcohol is converted into vinegar by acetic acid-forming bacteria (Acetobacter species). Acetic acid and malic acid combine to give vinegar its sour taste. 

There is no high-quality clinical evidence that regular consumption of apple cider vinegar helps to maintain or lose body weight, or is effective to manage blood glucose and lipid levels.

Nutrition
Apple cider vinegar is 94% water and 5% acetic acid with 1% carbohydrates and no fat or protein (table). In a 100 gram (ml) reference amount, it provides 22 calories, with negligible content of micronutrients.

Processing

Apples are loaded onto a processing belt where they are crushed, pressed, and the juice separated. The material is  stored in a submerged tank where the first fermentation process begins through which oxygen is supplied. Alcoholic fermentation is completed using the bacterial strain acetobacter, which converts the ethanol to acetic acid yielding vinegar. The "mother" is an undefined microbial culture left in the vinegar prior to distilling and pasteurization.

Health effects 
Despite its history of use in traditional medicine, there is no good evidence to support any health claims – such as for weight loss, glycemic control or skin infections – in humans, and its use is not recommended for any indication in medical guidelines of major public health organizations or regulatory agencies.

Safety concerns 

Although low-level consumption of apple cider vinegar is of low risk, particularly if it is diluted, reported adverse effects include esophageal damage, tooth enamel erosion, and excessive burping, flatulence, and bowel movements. Irritation and redness are common when the eyes come into contact with vinegar, and corneal injury can occur. Using vinegar as a topical medication, ear cleaning solution, or eye wash is hazardous. Although small amounts of apple cider vinegar may be used as a food flavoring, it may be unsafe for use by pregnant and breastfeeding women and by children. Different commercial brands of apple cider vinegar were found to have inconsistent acid levels, with some contaminated by molds and yeast.

If used as a homemade cleaning agent, apple cider vinegar, like any kind of vinegar, should not be mixed with chlorine bleach, the combination of which may release chlorine gas and irritate airways, eyes, nose and throat.

People with allergies to apples may experience allergic reactions to apple cider vinegar. Topical use of apple cider vinegar to treat skin diseases may cause burns. The use of apple cider vinegar may cause untoward interactions with prescription drugs, such as insulin or diuretics.

See also 

Mother of vinegar
Fire cider
Fulvic acid
United States v. Ninety-Five Barrels Alleged Apple Cider Vinegar
D. C. Jarvis

References

External links
 

Alternative medicine
Cider vinegar
Vinegar